Javier Astúa Araya (6 November 1968 – 4 January 2022) was a Costa Rican professional footballer who played as a forward.

Club career
Born in Quepos, Astúa played several years for Municipal Puntarenas and played two matches for Mexican outfit Morelia in September 1992. He had a frustrating four-month stint at Chilean side Palestino, before returning to Costa Rica where he joined Alajuelense. He later played for San Carlos, who released him in November 1995 after an injury-hit spell. In March 2006, he was released by Herediano. He finished his career at Carmelita before more injury cut short his career.

He was twice the Costa Rica Premier Division top goalscorer, in 1992 and 1994.

International career
Astúa made his debut for Costa Rica in an April 1992 friendly against El Salvador and earned a total of 13 caps, scoring seven goals. He has represented his country in four FIFA World Cup qualification matches and played at the 1993 UNCAF Nations Cup.

He played his final international game in January 1994 against Norway.

Later life and death
Astúa was married and had a daughter and a son, who was manager of Third Division side Jicaral in 2013. He died on 4 January 2022, at the age of 53.

Career statistics
Scores and results list Costa Rica's goal tally first, score column indicates score after each Astúa goal.

References

External links

1968 births
2022 deaths
People from Puntarenas Province
Association football forwards
Costa Rican footballers
Costa Rican expatriate footballers
Costa Rica international footballers
Puntarenas F.C. players
Atlético Morelia players
Club Deportivo Palestino footballers
L.D. Alajuelense footballers
A.D. San Carlos footballers
C.S. Herediano footballers
A.D. Carmelita footballers
Liga FPD players
Liga MX players
Chilean Primera División players
Expatriate footballers in Mexico
Expatriate footballers in Chile
Costa Rican football managers